Eucyclodes buprestaria is a moth of the family Geometridae. It is found in the southern half of Australia and in Tasmania.

The wingspan is about 30 mm.

The larvae feed on Cassytha glabella and Cassytha pubescens.

References

Geometridae
Moths of Australia
Moths described in 1857
Taxa named by Achille Guenée